Otomar Krejča (23 November 1921 – 6 November 2009) was a Czech theatre director and dissident.

Krejča was born in Skrýšov (now part of Pelhřimov), Czechoslovakia, on 23 November 1921. In 1956, he became a member of the Prague National Theater as an actor, and later a theater director at the landmark theater, which had opened in Prague in 1881. He co-founded the Za Branou Theater (Divadlo za branou: 'Theatre Behind the Gate') in Prague in 1965.

Krejča and his work was banned following the Soviet invasion of Czechoslovakia in 1968, which ended a period of political liberalization known as the Prague Spring. The new Czechoslovakian government would not allow Krejča to work in the country; he was only allowed to work abroad. He went on to direct more than 40 theatre productions, including in Austria, Italy, Belgium, France, Germany, Finland and Sweden. Krejča returned to work in his homeland following the fall of the Czechoslovakian Communist government in 1989. He received numerous Czech and foreign awards for his work.

Otomar Krejča died in Prague on 6 November 2009, at the age of 87.

References

External links

1921 births
2009 deaths
People from Pelhřimov
Czech theatre directors
Czech anti-communists
Recipients of Medal of Merit (Czech Republic)
Czech male stage actors
Czech male film actors
Czechoslovak male actors
Recipients of the Thalia Award